Brandon Dixon may refer to:

 Brandon Dixon (American football) (born 1990), American football cornerback
 Brandon Dixon (baseball) (born 1992), American baseball infielder and outfielder
 Brandon Victor Dixon (born 1981), American actor, singer and theatrical producer
 J. Brandon Dixon, professor of mechanical and biomedical engineering